Joan Wolf (born 1951 in Bronx, New York) is an American writer of romance novels.

Wolf grew up in the Bronx, New York. She obtained a bachelor's degree in Mercy College and Master in English and Comparative Literature in Hunter College.

Bibliography

Single novels
 A Kind of Honor, 1980
 A London Season, 1980
 The Counterfeit Marriage, 1980
 A difficult truce, 1981
 The Scottish Lord, 1981
 Beloved Stranger, 1982
 His Lordship's Mistress, 1982
 Margarita, 1982
 The American Duchess, 1982
 A Double Deception, 1983
 Change of Heart, 1983
 Lord Richard's Daughter, 1983
 Summer Storm, 1983
 Affair of the Heart, 1984
 Fool's Masquerade, 1984
 Portrait of a Love, 1984
 The Rebellious Ward, 1984
 A Fashionable Affair, 1985
 The divided sphere, 1985
 Wild Irish Rose, 1985
 The Rebel and the Rose, 1986
 Highland Sunset, 1987
 The Deception, 1996
 The Arrangement, 1997
 The Guardian, 1997
 The Gamble, 1998
 Golden Girl, 1999
 The Pretenders, 1999
 Someday Soon, 2000
 Royal Bride, 2001
 Silverbridge, 2002
 Black Diamond, 2003
 High Meadow, 2003
 That Summer, 2003
 Crossword, 2004
 White Horses, 2004
 To the Castle, 2005
 Dangerous Masquerade, 2006
 Someone Named Eva, 2007
 Daughter of Jerusalem, Worthy Publishing, April 2013.

Dark Ages of Britain series
 The Road to Avalon, 1988
 Born of the Sun, 1989
 The Edge of Light, 1990

Prehistorical Romances series
 Daughter of the Red Deer, 1991
 The Horsemasters, 1993
 The Reindeer Hunters, 1994

Medieval Mysteries series
 No Dark Place, 1999
 The Poisoned Serpent, 2000

Omnibus
 Beloved Stranger / Summer Storm, 1994

Anthologies in collaboration
 A regency Valentine, 1992 (with Emma Lange and Patricia Rice)
 Captured hearts: Five favorite love stories, 1999 (with Mary Balogh, Edith Layton, Mary Jo Putney and Patricia Rice)
 His Lordship's Mistress / Married by Mistake, 2000 (with Melinda McRae)

External links
 Joan Wolf's Official Website
 Joan Wolf in FantasticFiction

1951 births
Living people
Mercy College (New York) alumni
Hunter College alumni
20th-century American novelists
21st-century American novelists
American romantic fiction writers
American historical novelists
Writers of historical fiction set in the Middle Ages
Christian novelists
Writers of historical romances
Women romantic fiction writers
American women novelists
Women historical novelists
20th-century American women writers
21st-century American women writers